Stephidae is a family of copepods belonging to the order Calanoida.

Genera:
 Miostephos Bowman, 1976
 Parastephos Sars, 1902
 Speleohvarella Kršinic, 2005
 Stephos Scott, 1892

References

Copepods